Sangab (also Romanized as Sangāb) is a village in Salehabad Rural District, Salehabad County, Razavi Khorasan Province, Iran. At the 2006 census, its population was 176, in 36 families.

References 

Populated places in   Torbat-e Jam County